Benjamin Friedman (March 18, 1905 – November 24, 1982) was an American football player and coach, and athletic administrator.

A native of Cleveland, Ohio, Friedman played college football as a halfback and quarterback for the University of Michigan Wolverines from 1924 to 1926. Friedman played in the backfield on both offense and defense, handled kicking and return duties, and was known for his passing game.  He was a consensus first-team All-American in both 1925 and 1926, and won the Chicago Tribune Silver Football trophy as the most valuable player in the Big Ten Conference in 1926.

Friedman also played eight seasons in the National Football League (NFL) for the Cleveland Bulldogs (1927), Detroit Wolverines (1928), New York Giants (1929–1931), and  Brooklyn Dodgers (1932–1934). He was the leading passer of his era in the NFL and is credited with revolutionizing the game with his passing prowess. He led the league in passing for four consecutive years from 1927 to 1930, and was selected as the first-team All-NFL quarterback in each of those years. He also served as the head coach of the Giants during a portion of the 1930 season, and head coach of the Dodgers during the 1932 season.

Friedman later served as the head football coach at City College of New York from 1934 to 1941, and at Brandeis University from 1950 to 1959.  He was also the first Athletic Director at Brandeis, holding the position from 1949 to 1963. During World War II, he was a lieutenant in the United States Navy, serving as the deck officer aboard the aircraft carrier USS Shangri-La in the Pacific theater. He was part of the inaugural class of inductees into the College Football Hall of Fame in 1951, and was posthumously inducted into the Pro Football Hall of Fame in 2005.

Early years
Friedman was born in Cleveland, Ohio, and was Jewish. His father, Louis Friedman, was a Jewish tailor and furrier who immigrated to the United States from the Russian Empire in approximately 1890. His mother, Mayme (or Mamy) Atlevonik Friedman, was also a Russian Jew, who came to the United States in approximately 1894. His parents had five children: Rebecca (born c. 1898 in New Jersey); Harry (born c. 1900 in New York); Florence (born c. 1904 in New York); Benjamin; and Sydney (born c. 1908 in Ohio).

Friedman began his high school education at East Technical High School in Cleveland.  Sam Willaman, the school's football coach, told Friedman, who was then five feet, six inches, and less than 150 pounds, that, due to his small size, he would never make it as a football player. After being rejected by Willaman, Friedman transferred to Glenville High School on the east side of Cleveland. He played football, baseball and basketball and led Glenville's football team to the city championship in 1922.

University of Michigan
Friedman enrolled at the University of Michigan in 1923.  He played on the all-freshman football team in the fall of 1923.

1924 season
As a sophomore for the 1924 Michigan Wolverines football team, Friedman began the season as a backup. However, after an embarrassing 39–14 loss to Red Grange's Illinois team, head coach George Little made several changes to Michigan's lineup, including inserting Friedman as a starter at right halfback. Friedman remained at the right halfback position for the final five games of the season, and the Wolverines compiled a 4–1 record in those games. According to one account, "Friedman immediately changed Michigan from an ordinary football team into a great one."

On October 25, 1925, in his first collegiate start, Friedman helped Michigan defeat Wisconsin, 21–0.  The New York Times noted that Michigan had found "a new and dazzling gridiron meteor".  Friedman was responsible for all three Michigan touchdowns.  In the second quarter, he completed a "perfect pass spiraling" to Herb Steger for a 35-yard gain and Michigan's first points.  In the third quarter, Friedman broke through Wisconsin's left tackle and ran 26 yards for a touchdown.  In the fourth quarter, he threw a 29-yard pass to Charles Grube who was tackled at the seven-yard line, setting up a touchdown run by Dutch Marion.

Two weeks later, Friedman threw three touchdown passes in a 27–0 victory over Northwestern. One of Michigan's touchdowns was set up when Friedman intercepted a Northwestern pass and returned it 13 yards. On the next play, Friedman threw a touchdown pass to Dutch Marion.

At the end of the 1924 season, Friedman was the subject of a feature story by syndicated sports writer Billy Evans.  Evans described Friedman's soft passing touch: "Michigan receivers say that Friedman's passes float through the air like a feather, literally float in the air until you pluck the ball out of the ozone."

1925 season

As a junior, Friedman moved to the quarterback position and started all eight games. He led the 1925 Michigan team to a 7–1 record and a Big Ten Conference championship, as the Wolverines outscored opponents by a combined score of 227 to 3.  The only points allowed by the team were in a 3 to 2 loss to Northwestern in a game played in a heavy rainstorm on a field covered in mud five or six inches deep in some places.  At the end of the season, Michigan coach Fielding H. Yost called the 1925 Michigan team "the greatest football team I ever coached" and "the greatest football team I ever saw in action."

In the season opener, a 39–0 victory over Michigan State College, Friedman scored the first touchdown on a 65-yard run.  Later in the half, Friedman completed a pass to Charles Grube for a 20-yard gain and then completed another pass to Bruce Gregory for a 30-yard gain and a touchdown. In the second half, Friedman intercepted a pass and then completed a pass to Bennie Oosterbaan for a 24-yard gain and a touchdown.
In the second game of the season, Friedman led Michigan to a 63–0 victory over Indiana. Friedman accounted for 50 points, throwing five touchdown passes, running 55 yards for a touchdown, and kicking two field goals and eight extra points.

In Michigan's third game, a 21–0 victory over Wisconsin, Friedman threw a pass to Bruce Gregory for a 62-yard gain and a touchdown. Following the touchdown, Wisconsin kicked off, and Friedman returned the kickoff 85 yards for a touchdown.  Friedman converted both extra points, and Michigan led, 14–0, after the first three plays.  The AP noted: "It took just thirty-one seconds for Michigan to win the game at Madison and show the football world that Benny Friedman is destined for top rank among the great players developed by Yost."

On October 31, Friedman threw two touchdown passes in a 54–0 victory over Navy. Friedman also kicked five extra points in the game. Writing in the Chicago Daily Tribune, James Crusinberry wrote: "If any one man stood out, it was Benny Friedman, who hurled forward passes with accuracy and abandon time after time. . . . Besides that, Benny was a regular whirligig in carrying the ball.  And it was Benny who was the field general.  His selections of plays was something that would make any general envious." Crusinberry later added: "And now we have Mr. Yost's new Michigan team, with not a Grange on it, but with one of the brainiest players of the age in Benny Friedman and a lot of smart fellows to work with him.  Before Benny Friedman ends his career all the teams of the country, even the Navy, will have abandoned the old style football and will be using, or at least trying to use, smart and unexpected stuff.  It gains ground, it is spectacular, and it wins."

In the final game of the season, Friedman led Michigan to a 35–0 victory over Minnesota for the Wolverines' seventh shutout in eight games.  Friedman threw two touchdown passes to Oosterbaan, completed seven of 16 pass attempts for 130 yards, and converted all five extra-point kicks.

Historic data collected by the NCAA indicates that Friedman completed 34 of 83 passes during the 1925 season with 13 touchdown passes and eight interceptions. Friedman and Oosterbaan were both selected as consensus first-team All-Americans.  The passing combination of Friedman and Oosterbaan, which became known as "The Benny-To-Bennie Show," is considered "one of the greatest passing combinations in college football history."

1926 season
At the close of the 1925 season, Friedman was elected by his teammates to serve as the captain of the 1926 Michigan team. As captain, Friedman started seven of eight games at quarterback and led the 1926 team to a 7–1 record and a tie for the Big Ten Conference championship. The team's only loss was to national champion Navy.

Friedman was a triple-threat man for the 1926 team. In addition to passing, he handled kicking duties, returned punts, caught passes, and played in the backfield on both offense and defense. Much like Hank Greenberg in the 1930s, Friedman's success in the 1920s was a source of pride for Jews across the United States. In November 1926, at a ceremony before Michigan's game in Baltimore against Navy, "The Jewish Times" presented Friedman with a statue of himself running down the field.

At the end of the season, Friedman was a consensus All-American for the second consecutive year. He received first-team honors from the Associated Press, based on polling of "more than 100 coaches and critics" Collier's Weekly as selected by Grantland Rice with cooperation from ten leading coaches, the International News Service, the Newspaper Enterprise Association, the Central Press Association, based on a poll conducted by Norman Brown of 500 newspapers, each of which conducted its own election in which fans voted for the All-American team; Central Press reported compiling a million votes. New York Sun and Walter Eckersall.  He also received the Chicago Tribune Silver Football trophy as the most valuable player in the Big Ten Conference.

Professional football

Cleveland Bulldogs
In August 1927, Friedman announced that he would play professional football for the Cleveland Bulldogs in the National Football League (NFL). During the 1927 season, Friedman started all 13 games at quarterback and led Cleveland to an 8–4–1 record.  Cleveland had the top scoring offense in the league with an average of 16.1 points per game. In his first NFL game, he threw a 50-yard touchdown pass to Al Bloodgood. He led the NFL during the 1927 with 12 passing touchdowns and 1,721+ passing yards; his closest competitors totaled seven passing touchdowns and 1,362 passing yards. He was selected as a first-team All-NFL player by both the Chicago Tribune and the Green Bay Press Gazette.

Detroit Wolverines
In 1928, the Cleveland NFL franchise moved to Detroit and became known as the Detroit Wolverines. Friedman started all 10 games for the Wolverines and led the club to a 7–2–1 record. With Friedman at the helm, Detroit also had the top-scoring offense in the league with an average of 18.9 points scored per game. For the second straight season, he led the NFL with 10 passing touchdowns (double the next highest total) and 1,120+ yards, and was again selected as a first-team All-NFL player by both the Chicago Tribune and the Green Bay Press Gazette. Friedman also led the NFL in rushing touchdowns in 1928, making him the only player in NFL history to lead the league in both passing and rushing touchdowns in the same season.

New York Giants

In July 1929, Friedman signed with the New York Giants.  In his first year in New York, Friedman appeared in all 15 games and led the 1929 Giants to a 13–1–1 record, second best in the NFL. The Giants also had the top scoring offense in the league with an average of 20.8 points per game.  Friedman led the NFL with 985 passing yards, and his 20 touchdown passes set an NFL single season record that stood until 1942. After the final game of the 1929 season, one sports writer noted: "The uncanny field generalship of Friedman, combined with his bullet passes, was a big factor in the Giants' thirteenth and last victory of the season."

In 1930, Friedman had another strong season, appearing in 15 games for the Giants and helping the team to a 13–4 record.  The Giants again finished in second place in the NFL and had the top scoring offense in the league with 18.1 points scored per game. Friedman led the NFL with 922 passing yards and 10 touchdown passes in 1930.  For the fourth consecutive season, Friedman was selected as a first-team All-NFL player.

Friedman's passing proficiency was especially noteworthy considering that the football used at the time was rounder and more difficult to throw. Friedman called plays at the line of scrimmage and threw on first and second down, when most teams waited until third down. "Benny revolutionized football. He forced the defenses out of the dark ages." George Halas later said.

In February 1931, Friedman announced that he intended to retire from professional football.  He was hired as an assistant coach for the Yale Bulldogs football team. On October 26, 1931, Friedman signed a contract to return to the Giants for the remainder of the season. Since the Giants' practices were held in the morning, Friedman indicated that his duties with the Giants would not conflict with his coaching duties at Yale. Friedman appeared in nine games for the 1931 Giants.

Brooklyn Dodgers
In March 1932, Friedman signed as player, manager, and coach for the Brooklyn Dodgers. The Dodgers compiled a 3–9 record in 1932.

Friedman signed to return to the Dodgers in September 1933, though he did not serve as the head coach in 1933. He started five of ten games for the 1933 Dodgers. His average of 84.9 passing yards per game led the NFL for the 1933 season.

In 1934, Friedman appeared in only one NFL game.

Career accomplishments
In his eight seasons in the NFL, statistics are incomplete, but he appeared in 81 games, compiled at least 5,326 passing yards, and had 66 touchdown passes and 51 passes intercepted. He was the NFL's career leader in passing yardage until Sammy Baugh's seventh NFL season in 1947. Friedman also totaled over 1,000 yards rushing and over 400 yards on punt returns.  At the time of his retirement, Friedman also held the NFL record with 66 career touchdown passes.

Coaching career and military service

City College of New York
In February 1934, Friedman was hired as the football coach at City College of New York. He remained the coach at City College through the 1941 season, stepping down in 1942 for military service. Friedman's City College teams compiled a composite record of 27–31–4.

Military service

In the summer of 1942, Friedman enlisted in the United States Navy with the rank of lieutenant. He was named an assistant football coach at the Great Lakes Naval Training Station in North Chicago, Illinois. He later served as the deck officer aboard the aircraft carrier USS Shangri-La in the Pacific Ocean theater of World War II.

After being discharged, he went into the automobile sales business. He operated a Jeep dealership in Detroit.

Brandeis University
In June 1949, Friedman was hired as the athletic director at Brandeis University, a university founded in 1948 at Waltham, Massachusetts. He was also the school's first coach of the Brandeis football team when it began play in 1950.  He remained the head football coach at Brandeis through the 1959 season. In 10 years as head coach, Friedman's Brandeis football teams compiled a record of 38–35–4.

In 1960, Brandeis discontinued its football program, noting that "the per capita cost of fielding a varsity football team is inordinately high in relation to other varsity and intramural sports." Despite the end of the football program, Friedman remained as the athletic director at Brandeis until April 1963 when he resigned his post.

Halls of Fame and other honors
When the College Football Hall of Fame was established in 1951, Friedman was part of the inaugural group of 32 players and 21 coaches to be inducted.

Friedman also received acclaim for his professional football career. Sports writer Paul Gallico called Friedman "the greatest football player in the world."  Wellington Mara, the owner of the New York Giants, said of Friedman, "He was the Johnny Unitas of his day. He was the best of his time." George Halas gave Friedman credit for revolutionizing the game with his passing and wrote an article in 1967 titled "Halas Calls Friedman Pioneer Passer – Rest Came By Design."

However, when the Pro Football Hall of Fame was established in 1963, Friedman was overlooked. As years passed, numerous quarterbacks were inducted, including Sammy Baugh (1963), Dutch Clark (1963), Jimmy Conzelman (1964), Paddy Driscoll (1965), Otto Graham (1965), Sid Luckman (1965), Bob Waterfield (1965), Arnie Herber (1966), Bobby Layne (1967), Y. A. Tittle (1971), Norm Van Brocklin (1971), and Ace Parker (1972).  Friedman's frustration grew as he continued to be overlooked. In February 1976, more than 40 years after his NFL career had ended, he wrote a letter to The New York Times pleading his case. It was not until 2005, 23 years after his death, that Friedman was finally inducted into the Pro Football Hall of Fame. A group of 40 to 50 players who played for him at Brandeis printed brochures and lobbied for his induction. He was then nominated by the Hall's veterans committee and received the requisite votes by a 39-member panel of selectors.

Friedman has received numerous other honors, including the following:

 In 1961, he was inducted into the Michigan Sports Hall of Fame.
 In 1976, Friedman was inducted, as part of the inaugural class of inductees, into the Greater Cleveland Sports Hall of Fame.
 In 1979, Friedman was inducted into the International Jewish Sports Hall of Fame.
 In 1980, Friedman was inducted into the University of Michigan Athletic Hall of Honor.  He was the first quarterback and the seventh football player (behind Tom Harmon, Gerald Ford, Ron Kramer, Bennie Oosterbaan, Willie Heston, and Germany Schulz) to be inducted into the Hall of Honor.
 In 2004, he was inducted into the National Jewish Sports Hall of Fame.

Family and later years
Friedman was married in February 1931 to Shirley Immerman, a resident of Brooklyn. The wedding was held at a Long Island country club with Guy Lombardo and his orchestra providing the entertainment. They were married for more than 50 years.

In 1949, Friedman became Brandeis University's first athletic director. He also served as head football coach until the school dropped the program. He went on sabbatical in September 1962 and resigned the following April, citing business pressures and the growth of his boys' quarterback school at Camp Kohut in Oxford, Maine. He sold the camp in 1969.

In his later years, Friedman suffered from multiple health problems.  He battled and beat cancer, underwent back surgery, and suffered from heart disease and diabetes.  In April 1979, Friedman developed a diffused clot of arteries in his left leg that resulted in gangrene.  He underwent a partial amputation of his left leg below the knee.

In November 1982, he was found dead in his apartment in New York City as the result of a self-inflicted gunshot wound. He left a note indicating that he was "severely depressed." Friedman was survived by his wife, Shirley, a brother, and a sister.

Professional wrestler Maxwell Jacob Friedman claims to be a relative of Friedman.

Head coaching record

College

See also
 History of the New York Giants (1925–1978)
 List of Michigan Wolverines football All-Americans
 List of select Jewish football players

References

Sources
 Gottehrer, Barry. The Giants of New York, the history of professional football's most fabulous dynasty. New York, G. P. Putnam's Sons, 1963 OCLC 1356301

External links
 
 
 

1905 births
1982 deaths
American football quarterbacks
American people of Russian-Jewish descent
Brandeis Judges athletic directors
Brandeis Judges football coaches
Brooklyn Dodgers (NFL) coaches
Brooklyn Dodgers (NFL) players
CCNY Beavers football coaches
Cleveland Bulldogs players
Michigan Wolverines football players
New York Giants head coaches
New York Giants players
Yale Bulldogs football coaches
College Football Hall of Fame inductees
Pro Football Hall of Fame inductees
Glenville High School alumni
Sportspeople from Cleveland
Coaches of American football from Ohio
Players of American football from Cleveland
Jewish American sportspeople
Suicides by firearm in New York City
United States Navy personnel of World War II
United States Navy officers
1982 suicides